Vistasp Karbhari is an Indian-American civil engineer and university administrator. Karbhari was the eighth president of the University of Texas at Arlington. Prior to that, he was provost and executive vice president for academic affairs at the University of Alabama in Huntsville. He is known for his research in composite materials and structural engineering.

Life and career 
Karbhari earned his Bachelor of Engineering (in Civil Engineering, 1984) and Master of Engineering (1985) degrees from the University of Pune in India, and PhD (1991) from the University of Delaware. Before moving to Alabama in 2008, he was a professor of structural engineering and of materials science at the University of California, San Diego. He is author or co-author on over 500 publications in referred journals, conference articles, and book chapters and is the editor/coeditor of 6 books. Due to his research leadership he serves on the editorial boards of numerous international journals including as Associate Editor of the Journal of Civil
Structural Health Monitoring 1, American Editor of the International Journal of Materials and Product Technology 2, and on the editorial board of the ASTM Journal of Testing and Evaluation, and the Indian Concrete Journal 3 among others.

As President of The University of Texas at Arlington, Karbhari was recognized for leading the university to Carnegie R-1 status and being designated as a Hispanic Serving Institution and for his initiatives on enhancing social mobility, student success and for STEM. Under his tenure, the College of Engineering at the University of Texas at Arlington has seen an increase in enrollment and funding.  In September 2020, the full Board of Regents of the University of Texas System honored Dr. Karbhari by signing a declaration expressing their deep and sincere appreciation for his thoughtful vision, exceptional leadership and distinguished service to the University of Texas System as President of the University of Texas at Arlington from 2013 to 2020. On November 24, 2020, the American Association for the Advancement of Science - one of the world's most respected organizations - selected Vistasp Karbhari as a fellow. Dr. Karbhari was elected for his “distinguished contributions to the field of composites in civil infrastructure, particularly in low-cost processing, durability and damage tolerance, rehabilitation and multi-threat mitigation.” The AAAS is the world's largest general scientific society and publisher of the journal Science.

Karbhari is also a fellow of the National Academy of Inventors, ASM International, the American Society of Civil Engineers (ASCE), the Structural Engineering Institute of ASCE, the International Institute for Fiber-Reinforced Polymers in Construction and the International Society for Structural Health Monitoring of Intelligent Infrastructure. In 2019, he was elected a member of the European Academy of Sciences and Arts. In 2021 he was named a Fellow of Complete College America for his leadership in student access and success, inclusivity, enhancing degree completion, and for leading reform in higher education. 4 In 2022 he was named a Fierce Education Leader for being at “the forefront of re-envisioning the future of higher education for more than a decade through his leadership in areas such as enhancing access and equity while increasing excellence, increasing integration between academic knowledge and talent development for the workforce and entrepreneurship.”

Resignation and controversies 
Karbhari's tenure as President of the University of Texas at Arlington had two major controversies, the later of which led directly to his resignation on March 19, 2020.

The first controversy was a lawsuit from former vice president for Institutional Advancement, Deborah Robinson, which was reported by the Star-Telegram. She had been terminated in March 2019 and alleged then-President Karhbari had a history of bullying, mistreating and discriminating against Deborah, Linda Johnsrud, Nan Ellin, and Lynne Waters according to the lawsuit. Deborah sought $200,000 in damages at the time.

According to school newspaper, the Shorthorn, a UT system performance evaluation for Karbhari in 2017 contained an addendum that listed four administrators who listed the then-President as the reason for their resignations. They were Nakia Pope, former Center for Teaching and Learning Excellence director; Lorraine Phillips, former assistant vice provost for Institutional Effectiveness and Reporting; Linda Johnsrud, former vice president of Academic Affairs; and Nan Ellin,  former dean of the College of Architecture, Planning and Public Affairs. Tony Cucolo, then a UT System associate vice chancellor, noted in a May 2018 informal assessment that U.T.A. under Karbhari's tenure had "an atypically high turnover rate" and that Karbhari was working with a coach to improve his leadership skills upon the recommendation of the UT System.

The second controversy was related to a 2019 audit report involving Karbhari's violations of UT System and UTA rules and guidelines in addition to state laws. Beginning in January 2019 the state auditor referred to the UT System anonymous complaints relating to UTA's online education recruiting and enrollment practices which directly led to an outside firm, Protiviti, being selected to investigate the allegations. The audit was submitted to the system in October 2019, and was officially released by the UT System on March 19, 2020. The audit determined that then-President Karhbari had allowed a third-party vendor that directly operated the online course program to provide input on admissions policies, that he violated UT System rules regarding conflicts of interests and administration procedures, and violated the Texas administrative Code.

Additionally, the audit detailed the inappropriate conflict of interest between Karbhari and the third-party vendor called Academic Partnerships, such as going on two international trips with the vendors executives and soliciting donations to the school from the vendor and its chairman amounting over $1 million.

Karhbari initially wrote to then UT System Chancellor James Milliken on Jan 6th 2020 that he intended to announce his resignation no later than January 31. His resignation announcement came on March 4, 2020, in which he stipulated that he would continue functioning as president until August 31. On March 19, 2020, Karbhari released another statement announcing his effective resignation immediately, with Vice Provost Teik C. Lim being named administrator in charge until  May 2 when James Milliken announced Lim serving as ad interim President.

References

Living people
Presidents of the University of Texas at Arlington
American structural engineers
American civil engineers
21st-century American engineers
20th-century American engineers
American people of Parsi descent
American academics of Indian descent
Parsi people
Year of birth missing (living people)